Faqeeru Koe is a 2008 Maldivian period short-film written and directed by Ahmed Falah. Produced by Mohamed Abdulla under Dhekedheke Ves Production, the film stars Mohamed Abdulla, Sheela Najeeb in pivotal roles.

Premise
Kasim Fulhu (Mohamed Abdulla) and Sanfa Fulhu (Sheela Najeeb) are an underprivileged married couple who has a large family of six children. Despite their financial instability, the family manages every shortcomings, though the husband believes in a philosophy where a man shall never confide in a woman and shall never disclose the financial details to his wife. One day, the family were attended by two generous businessmen from the atoll, where they lend some money to Kasim Fulhu who hides all the statements and details from Sanfa Fulhu.

Their lives take an unexpected downfall when Sanfa Fulhu sells a cadjan unbeknownst to her that Kasim Fulhu has hidden all the money inside the cadjan. The businessmen return to the island and queries the couple on their limitations. Expecting a change in their lives, the men handover the money to Sanfa Fulhu this time, who makes a positive change to their lives.

Cast 
 Mohamed Abdulla as Kasim Fulhu
 Sheela Najeeb as Sanfa Fulhu 
 Mufeed as Razzaq
 Naeem as Thahhaan
 Ali Waheed as Ali Fulhu
 Matheen as Ibrahim Fulhu
 Mohamed as Mohamedbe
 Siththi as Siththi
 Aminafulhu as Fathimaidhaitha
 Abdul Kareem as Edhurube
 Ahmed as Seytu

Soundtrack

Accolades

References

Maldivian short films
2008 short films
2008 films